Leo Paul Kocialkowski (August 16, 1882 – September 27, 1958) was an American politician who served 5 terms as a Democratic U.S. Representative from Illinois from 1933 to 1943.

Biography 
Kocialkowski was born in Chicago, Illinois, the son of Michael and Dorothy (née Wendzinski) Kocialkowski, and was orphaned at an early age.
He was educated in private schools, which he supplemented by a business course.
He worked in various capacities in several business houses in Chicago.
He engaged in tax appraisal and delinquent tax supervision in Cook County, Illinois from 1916 to 1932.

He served as delegate to the Democratic National Convention in 1928.

Congress 
Kocialkowski was elected as a Democrat to the Seventy-third and to the four succeeding Congresses (March 4, 1933 – January 3, 1943).
He served as chairman of the Committee on Insular Affairs (Seventy-fourth through Seventy-seventh Congresses).
He was an unsuccessful candidate for renomination in 1942.

Later career and death 
He served as member of the Civil Service Commission of Cook County, Illinois from 1945 to 1949.
He died in Chicago, Illinois, September 27, 1958.
He was interred in St. Adelbert Cemetery.

References

1882 births
1958 deaths
Politicians from Chicago
American politicians of Polish descent
Democratic Party members of the United States House of Representatives from Illinois
20th-century American politicians